The Berkeley is a five-star deluxe hotel, located in Wilton Place, Knightsbridge, London. The hotel is owned and managed by Maybourne Hotel Group, which also owns Claridge's and The Connaught in Mayfair, London.

History

1800s and early 1900s
Located on the corner of Piccadilly and Berkeley Street, it was the base for drivers of mail coaches travelling to the West Country and hence named the Gloucester coffee house. As a result, it started to expand and became a hotel for travellers both to and from London who were travelling on the mail coach services.

With the coming of the railways, in 1897 the building was formally renamed The Berkeley Hotel, a location trusted by the parents of debutantes to keep an eye on the reputation of their daughters.

In 1900, Richard D'Oyly Carte bought the hotel, and his family remained in control for the next century. In the 1920s The Berkeley became one of the first London hotels with air conditioning, and in the 1930s double glazing. Ferraro, the maitre d'hotel of the Berkeley Grill, was a fixture of London nightlife in the 1920s and 1930s and appears in several novels of the period, such as Dennis Wheatley's Three Inquisitive People, written 1932 but not published till 1940. He also is mentioned in P. G. Wodehouse's 1931 novel, Big Money, some of which takes place at the Berkeley.

Late 1900s and 2000s
In 1972, the hotel moved to a new building designed by British architect Brian O'Rorke on Wilton Place, Knightsbridge. Incorporating restored features from the original building, it was also unique in that it was London's only hotel with a rooftop swimming pool until well into the 21st century. The Berkeley's top floor, its seventh, also houses its Bamford Haybarn Spa, which debut in 2013.

In the 1980s, Madame Somoza, had become a frequent customer at the restaurant and even Queen Elizabeth used to lunch with friends.

In the winter months Health Club & Spa transforms its rooftop terrace into a pine-filled forest cinema. Hotel guests and visitors alike are treated to winter classics on the big screen while nestling between warm down-feather Moncler blankets and hot water bottles.

In 2005, The Savoy Group, including The Berkeley, was sold to a group of Irish investors. The sale of The Savoy Group led to the Savoy Hotel and Savoy Theatre being sold off and the remaining properties, including the Berkeley, being renamed as the Maybourne Hotel Group.

Restaurants and bars
In 1998, Pierre Koffmann moved his Michelin starred "La Tante Claire" from the area of Chelsea to the hotel, serving his signature dish of pig's trotter stuffed with morel mushrooms. The original Chelsea site was taken over by Gordon Ramsay, who opened the signature Restaurant Gordon Ramsay there. Replaced at the hotel in 2003 by the Gordon Ramsay-run "Boxwood Café", after its closure Koffmann returned in April 2010 to open the signature "Koffmann's" restaurant at the hotel. Koffmann's at The Berkeley closed on 31 December 2016.

Marcus Wareing heads the Michelin 1 star-rated "Marcus", which in 2010 replaced Gordon Ramsay's Michelin-starred Pétrus restaurant.

The Collins Room is home to the Pret a Portea, and serves afternoon tea.

The Blue Bar was designed by Dublin architect David Collins, and is decorated entirely in Lutyens Blue, a colour he created in honour of Edwin Lutyens. In 2004, an album entitled The Blue Bar was released through Warner Dance, featuring a mix of ambient techno and electronica regularly played in the bar.

See also
Hotels in London

References

External links
 The Berkeley website

Hotels in the City of Westminster
Knightsbridge